The following is a list of works by Timothy Leary. The majority of Leary's works were put into the public domain by his estate in 2009.

Articles
 "Turn On / Tune In / Drop Out." East Village Other, vol. 1, no. 12 (June 1966), p. 5.
 Dr. Leary introduces and explains his famous psychedelic mantra "turn on, tune in, drop out". Supposedly the first installment of a regular column, but apparently this was the only one.

Academic journals
 "The Interpersonal Dimension of Personality," with Mervin B. Freedman, Abel G. Ossorio, and Hubert S. Coffey. Journal of Personality, vol. 20, no. 2 (1951), pp. 143-161. . .
 Reprinted as a 28-page off-print by Duke University Press. .
 "The studies on which this paper is based have been sponsored by Permanente Foundation Hospital, Oakland, California, under the codirection of Hubert S. Coffey, Ph.D, and Harvey Powelson, M.D. The current expanded research project is in part supported by the U.S. Public Health Service under the direction of Saxton T. Pope, Jr, M.D. The authors are grateful to Dr. Jean Walker Macfarlane for her editorial contributions to this article." (p. 143).
 "The Interpersonal Dimension of Personality II: An Objective Study of Repression," with Rolfe LaForge, Herbert Naboisek, and Hubert S. Coffey. Journal of Personality, vol. 23, no. 2 (1954), pp. 129-153. . .
 "The studies on which this paper is based have been sponsored by Kaiser Foundation Hospital, Oakland, California, under the direction of Harvey Powelson, M.D., and were supported in part by Research Grant MH-331 from the National Institute of Mental Health, Public Health Service, under the direction of Hubert S. Coffey, Ph.D., and Saxton T. Pope, Jr., M.D." (p. 129).
 "Interpersonal Diagnosis: Some Problems of Methodology and Validation," with Hubert S. Coffey, Ph.D. Journal of Abnormal and Social Psychology, vol. 50, no. 1 (January 1955), pp. 110–124. . .
 "The Cyber-Punk: The Individual as Reality Pilot." Mississippi Review, vol. 16, no. 2/3 (1988), pp. 252–265. .

Magazines
 "The Seers' Catalog." Omni (January 1987). Cover art.

Books
 The Interpersonal Diagnosis of Personality (1957)
 The Psychedelic Experience: A Manual Based on the Tibetan Book of the Dead, with Ralph Metzner and Richard Alpert) (1964). .
 Psychedelic Prayers after the Tao Te Ching. Poets Press (1966)
 Start Your Own Religion. Millbrook, New York: Kriya Press (1967)
 The original 1967 version was privately published. It is not to be confused with a compilation of Leary's writings compiled, edited, and published posthumously under the same title.
 The Politics of Ecstasy. G. P. Putnam (1968). .
 The first eleven chapters were re-published as Politics of Ecstasy in 1990 and the final eleven chapters as Tune In, Turn On, Drop Out in 1999.
 High Priest (1968). .
 Jail Notes (1970). Preface by Allen Ginsberg. Douglas Book Corp.
 Confessions of a Hope Fiend. New York: Bantam Books (1973). . .
 Neurologic (with Joanna Leary) (1973)
 StarSeed (1973)
 Mystery, Magic & Miracle: Religion in a Post-Aquarian Age (with Edward F. Heenan and Jack Fritscher. Prentice-Hall (1973). .
 What Does WoMan Want?: Adventures Along the Schwarzchild Radius (1976)
 His only novel, revised and reprinted in 1987 by New Falcon Publications in Tempe, Arizona.
 The Periodic Table of Evolution (1977)
 Exo-Psychology: A Manual on The Use of the Nervous System According to the Instructions of the Manufacturers. Los Angeles: Starseed/Peace Press (1977). .
 Republished as Info-Psychology in 1987 by Falcon Press Publications in Tempe, Arizona.
 Neuropolitics: The Sociobiology of Human Metamorphosis (with Robert Anton Wilson and George A. Koopman. Los Angeles: Starseed/Peace Press (1977). .
 Edited by Daniel Gilbertson and George A. Koopman, designed and illustrated by Cynthia Marsh.
 The Game of Life. Culver City, Calif.: Peace Press (1979)
 The Intelligence Agents. Culver City, Calif.: Peace Press (1979)
 Republished in 1996 by New Falcon Publications in Tempe, Arizona.
 Changing My Mind Among Others. Prentice Hall (1982). .
 Flashbacks. Tarcher (1983). .
 Info-Psychology. Tempe, Ariz.: Falcon Press Publications (1987)
 Revision of Exo-Psychology: A Manual on The Use of the Nervous System According to the Instructions of the Manufacturers. Los Angeles: Starseed/Peace Press (1977). .
 
 Chaos and Cyber Culture (with Michael Horowitz and Vicki Marshall). Ronin Publishing (1994).
 Surfing the Conscious Nets: A Graphic Novel (with Robert Williams). Last Gasp (1995). .
 A Letter from Timothy Leary to Aldous Huxley. Leary Archives Press (1996).
 Limited-edition publication includes the 1960 letter.
 Concrete & Buckshot: William S. Burroughs Paintings. Leary, Timothy and Benjamin Weissman. 1996. Smart Art Press.
 Design for Dying, with R. U. Sirius. HarperCollins (1997). .
 The Politics of Ecstasy. Foreword by Tom Robbins. Introductions by R. U. Sirius and Timothy Leary. (Berkeley, Calif.: Ronin Publishing (1990).
 "Collector's Note: The original edition of The Politics of Ecstasy has been divided into two books. This abbreviated edition carries the original title of Politics of Ecstasy and contains chapters 1 to 11 of the original. The remaining material appears in a companion book entitled Tune In, Turn On, Drop Out containing Chapters 12 to 22 of the original text."
 The Delicious Grace of Moving One's Hand: The Collected Sex Writings. Thunder's Mouth Press (1999). .
 Turn On, Tune In, Drop Out. Ronin Publishing (1999). .
 The original edition of The Politics of Ecstasy was divided into two books by Ronin Publishing. The first abbreviated edition carried the original title of Politics of Ecstasy and contained chapters 1 to 11 of the original. The remaining material appeared in this companion book entitled Tune In, Turn On, Drop Out, and contained Chapters 12 to 22 of the original text.
 Change Your Brain. (with Beverly A. Potter). Ronin Publishing (2001)
 Politics of Self-Determination. (with Beverly A. Potter). Ronin Publishing (2001). .
 The Politics of Psychopharmacology. (with Beverly A. Potter). Ronin Publishing (2001). .
 Musings on Human Metamorphoses (with Beverly A. Potter). Ronin Publishing (2002). .
 Evolutionary Agents (with Beverly A. Potter). Ronin Publishing (2004). .

Book contributions
 Foreword to Cosmic Trigger I: The Final Secret of The Illuminati, by Robert Anton Wilson. New York: And/or (1977), pp. ix-xiii.
 Afterword to The Lost Beatles Interviews, by Geoffrey Giuliano, Brenda Giuliano. Plume (1996). .

Other publications

Dissertations
 The Social Dimensions of Personality: Group Process and Structure (Ph.D. Dissertation). University of California, Berkeley (1950).

Journal issues as editor
 Journal of Social Issues, vol. 6, no. 1, Community Service and Social Research – Group Psychotherapy in a Church Program (1950).
 Issue edited with Hubert Coffey and Mervin Freedman. Published by the Society for the Psychological Study of Social Issues.

Non-print creative works

Discography

 The Psychedelic Experience: A Manual Based on the Tibetan Book of the Dead (with Richard Alpert & Ralph Metzner) (1966)
 Reissued on CD in 2003.
 L.S.D. (1966)
 Turn On, Tune In, Drop Out (The Original Motion Picture Soundtrack). Mercury Records (1967). Full audio.
 Ostensibly a "user manual" for a self-guided LSD "trip". While the album did poorly in general release, it has become one of the rarest "memorabilia" items from Leary's work. One track, "All The Girls Are Yours" has been performed repeatedly by others, and was re-recorded in 2004.
 You Can Be Anyone This Time Around (1970)
 Seven Up. Ash Ra Tempel (1972)
 Flashbacks (1983)
 The Inner Frontier (with Robert Anton Wilson) (ACE Tapes, 1988)
 From Psychedelics to Cybernetics (ACE Tapes, 1989)
 The Origins of Dance (with The Grid) (1990)
 Uncommon Quotes: Timothy Leary (Pub Group West, 1990) .
 How to Operate Your Brain (ACE Tapes, 1992)
 Right to Fly (1996)
 Beyond Life With Timothy Leary. Mouth Almighty with Mercury Records (1996)
 "Beyond Life with Timothy Leary celebrates the life, death and after-life of Timothy Leary. The spiritual quality of this album, both musically and lyrically, characterizes it as a conceptual album, one that must be experienced from start to finish, in the tradition of a Pink Floyd album. Its ethereal quality makes this album a unique collection of dance-trance masterpieces intermixed with the best of Timothy Leary. The album features the Moody Blues' new version of their classic "Legend of a Mind," a new cut by Al Jourgensen (Ministry), and a tribute from Allen Ginsberg."
 Timothy Leary Live at Starwood. Association for Consciousness Exploration. .
 Recorded and released on cassette in 1992, and later released on CD in 2001.
 Timothy Leary: A Cheerleader for Change (ACE Tapes, with Llewellyn Collection, 2001). .
 Recorded in 1985.

Also appears on
 Leary sings in the chorus of John Lennon's 1969 song "Give Peace a Chance".
 Samples of Leary speaking appear on Tune In (Turn On The Acid House) [12" EP]. Psychic TV / Temple Records (UK) (1988)
 Trance-Techno Express: From Detroit to Berlin & Back. Various (1993)
 "The Incredible Lightness of Being Molecular," the opening track on Fifty Years of Sunshine (1993)
 A CD that celebrated the invention of LSD. Recorded in Los Angeles by Genesis P-Orridge and Doug Rushkoff on March 14, 1993. Written by Dr. Timothy Leary for the special publication Lysergic Times, edited by Michael Horowitz to commemorate 50 years of LSD, and launched on April 16, 1993 in San Francisco, USA.
 Guest vocalist on "Gila Copter", the opening track of the Revolting Cocks' album Linger Ficken' Good... and Other Barnyard Oddities (1993)
 Ancient Lights and the Blackcore, with Scorn, Seefeel, Yanomami Shamans from the Amazon, and DJ Cheb I. Sabbah (1995)
 Krautrock. Various [Polygram] (1997)
 Sub Rosa Underwood, Vol. 3: A Sampler. Various (1998)
 Intermenstral. Various (2001)

Filmography
 A full list of appearances (both as himself and in acting roles), direction, and other participation in film and television media by Leary can be found at:

Multimedia performances
 During late 1966 and early 1967, Leary toured college campuses presenting a multi-media performance called "The Death of the Mind," which attempted to artistically replicate the LSD experience.

 In the early 1990s, Leary created several films in a form of hypnosis-tape he referred to as "Retinal Logic". These included Think for Yourself, How to Operate your Brain, and How to Operate your Brain Show (the final being a Public Access Television version of its namesake). Each video is presented as a lecture and demo of technological delivery method for hypnopædic learning. The videos include a barrage of colors, and early examples of Binural Entrainment

Computer games
 Equal parts party game, roleplaying game and social simulation, Timothy Leary's Mind Mirror was released for Commodore 64, Atari XL, Apple II, and MS-DOS computers by Electronic Arts in 1985. The game was a digital reinterpreting of Leary's doctoral thesis. He later stated that he had plans to release an updated version of the program with advanced graphics (including Apple Macintosh and Amiga versions), but that never occurred. Timothy Leary's estate reported that the rights to the game were given back to their original programmers, who in-turn were attempting to update the program for a modern audience. This project evolved into "Mind Mirror 6"

References

Further reading
 An Annotated Bibliography of Timothy Leary, by Michael Horowitz, Karen Walls, and Billy Smith. Foreword by Allen Ginsberg. Preface by Timothy Leary. Introduction by Frank Barron, Ph.D., Sc.D. Hamden, Conn.: Archon Books (1988). 305 pages. . .
 "Summary Bibliography: Timothy Leary." Internet Speculative Fiction Database.

External links
 Timothy Leary Archives: Videos at Internet Archive
 Journal articles by Leary at JSTOR

Timothy Leary
Bibliographies by writer
Bibliographies of American writers
Psychology bibliographies